Xanthorrhoea semiplana is a species of grass tree found in south-eastern Australia.  It has two subspecies:

 Xanthorrhoea semiplana ssp. semiplana – Tufted grass tree, found on the Eyre, Yorke and Fleurieu Peninsulas, south-eastern South Australia and probably central-western Victoria
 Xanthorrhoea semiplana ssp. tateana – Kangaroo Island grass tree, Tate's grass tree or Yakka Bush

References

Flora of South Australia
Flora of Victoria (Australia)
semiplana
Plants described in 1864
Taxa named by Ferdinand von Mueller